Montclar Castle is a fortress of the town of Montclar d'Urgell, in Catalonia, declared historic artistic monument of national interest at 1979. It is strategically located at one of the highest points of the Montclar mountain range. It is built on the remains of an ancient Roman tower and was renovated in the 17th century with an architecture of the Catalan Renaissance.

Gallery

References

Castles in Catalonia
Museums in Catalonia
Buildings and structures completed in the 10th century
Urgell
10th-century fortifications